Alexander Karl Mikael Björk (born 7 June 1990) is a Swedish professional golfer who plays on the European Tour. He won the 2018 Volvo China Open, and has recorded runner-up finishes at the UBS Hong Kong Open, British Masters, DP World Tour Championship and Ras Al Khaimah Championship. In 2021, he finished 12th in the Race to Dubai.

Professional career
Björk turned professional as a teenager in 2009 and joined the Swedish Golf Tour, where he won his first event as a professional, the Swedish PGA Championship, in his rookie season.

In 2012, Björk became the first golfer to list himself through Trade in Sports, an exchange for athletes, funding the launch of his professional career by pledging 10% of winnings to investors.

Challenge Tour
In 2013, he won the Arlandastad MoreGolf Open and finished 6th in the Nordic Golf League rankings to earn promotion to the Challenge Tour. His international break-trough season came in 2016, where he won the Le Vaudreuil Golf Challenge in France and secured a card for the European Tour through a seventh place on the 2016 Challenge tour rankings. The season saw eight top-ten finishes including a tie for second at the Terre dei Consoli Open in Italy. He reached a rank of 181 on the Official World Golf Ranking.

European Tour
On the 2017 European Tour, Björk shared the lead with Peter Uihlein heading into the final round of Open de France, an Open Qualifying Series and Rolex Series event with a purse of US$7 million. He eventually finished tied for third, which earned him a spot at the 2017 Open Championship and saw him rise to 116 on the OWGR.

In the opening tournament of the 2018 European Tour, Björk shared the lead heading into the final round of UBS Hong Kong Open, but shot his second in the bunker on the final hole and missed a short putt for par and a playoff, finishing tied for second. In April 2018, the week after he finished third at Trophée Hassan II, Björk won his first European Tour title at the Volvo China Open in Beijing, moving into the top ten of the 2018 Race to Dubai rankings and a world ranking of 73. In October he was runner-up at the Sky Sports British Masters. He finished the season 19th in the Race to Dubai and with a career-high world rank of 59.

Björk made less of an impact in 2019 and 2020, but comfortably kept his card. He was tied for third at the Hero Open in England in August 2020, his best finish since 2018.

In 2021, Björk finished tied second with Matt Fitzpatrick at the DP World Tour Championship, Dubai, two shots behind winner Collin Morikawa, and advanced to 12th on the final 2021 Race to Dubai ranking.

During 2022, Björk surpassed €5 million in career earnings, but struggled with a back injury and missed the latter part of the season. After three months of rehab, he returned to tour for the 2023 UAE swing, where he finished joint runner-up at the Ras Al Khaimah Championship, one stroke behind Daniel Gavins, missing out on a playoff after a bogey on the final hole.

Professional wins (5)

European Tour wins (1)

1Co-sanctioned by the Asian Tour

Challenge Tour wins (1)

Nordic Golf League wins (2)

Other wins (1)
2015 Abbekås Open (Swedish Mini tour Future Series)

Results in major championships
Results not in chronological order in 2020.

CUT = missed the half-way cut
"T" = tied
NT = No tournament due to the COVID-19 pandemic

Results in World Golf Championships

"T" = tied

Team appearances
World Cup (representing Sweden): 2018

See also
2016 Challenge Tour graduates

References

External links

Swedish male golfers
European Tour golfers
Sportspeople from Kronoberg County
People from Växjö
People from Jönköping
1990 births
Living people
21st-century Swedish people